Alice Hoffenberg Amsden (June 27, 1943 – March 14, 2012) was a political economist and scholar of state-led economic development. For the last two decades of her career, she was the Barton L. Weller Professor of Political Economy at the Massachusetts Institute of Technology.

Amsden was known best for her work on the developmental state, which argued that state-led industrialization was a viable alternative to the market-oriented industrialization of North America and Europe. Her scholarship focused on the catch-up of late-industrializing economies, particularly the "Asian Tigers." Amsden found their growth was accomplished through government intervention that established price control and import substitution policies, promoted organizational learning, and arranged "reciprocal control mechanisms" between states and private firms. Her work is viewed as a rebuttal of the Washington Consensus and neoclassical economic theories that sought to restrain state intervention in the developmental process.

Life and career
Born in New York City, Amsden received her undergraduate degree from Cornell University and her PhD from the London School of Economics. Amsden began her career as an economist at the Organisation for Economic Co-operation and Development (OECD) and taught at University of California, Los Angeles, Barnard College at Columbia University, Harvard Business School and The New School before being appointed professor at MIT in 1994. She remained in MIT's Department of Urban Studies and Planning until her death in 2012.

In addition to teaching and writing, she was a consultant to the World Bank, OECD and various organizations within the United Nations. In 2002, she was awarded the Leontief Prize by the Global Development and Environment Institute and was named one of the top 50 visionaries by Scientific American for her premise that one-size-fits-all economic policies are ill-suited for poor countries looking to become industrialized. In 2009, she was appointed by the United Nations secretary-general to a 3-year seat on the U.N. Committee on Development Policy, a subsidiary of the U.N. Economic and Social Council. The 24-member committee provides inputs and independent advice to the council on emerging cross-sectoral development issues and on international cooperation for development.

Amsden wrote several books about the industrialization of developing countries. Her work emphasized the importance of the state as a facilitator and guide of economic development. She also saw knowledge as a crucial determinant of economic growth. Her books include Asia's Next Giant: South Korea and Late Industrialisation and The Rise of the Rest. In the former she concentrated on the development of South Korea and in the latter she compared the experiences of several developing countries—mostly East Asian and Latin American countries.

In 2012, Amsden died suddenly at her home in Cambridge at the age of 68.

Books
In addition to numerous journal articles, Amsden published:
 The Role of Elites in Economic Development, Oxford University Press, 2012, (with Alisa Di Caprio and James A. Robinson). 
 Escape from Empire: The Developing World's Journey through Heaven and Hell, MIT Press, 2007. 
 Beyond Late Development: Taiwan's Upgrading Policies, MIT Press, 2003, (with Wan Wen Chu).
 The Rise of "The Rest": Challenges to the West From Late-Industrializing Economies, Oxford University Press, 2001.
 The Market Meets Its Match: Restructuring the Economies of Eastern Europe, Harvard University Press, 1994 (with Jacek Kochanowicz and Lance Taylor). 
 Asia's Next Giant: South Korea and Late Industrialization, Oxford University Press, 1989. Awarded "Best Book in Political Economy," American Political Science Association, 1992.

References

External links
 Winner of the 2002 Leontief Prize for Advancing the Frontiers of Economic Thought
 Column archive at The Nation
 
 MIT 2012 Memorial Symposium
 Special Issue of Journal of Regions, Economy and Society on Amsden's contributions

Cornell University alumni
Alumni of the London School of Economics
University of California, Los Angeles faculty
Barnard College faculty
Harvard Business School faculty
MIT School of Architecture and Planning faculty
The New School faculty
Economists from New York (state)
American women economists
American development economists
2012 deaths
1943 births
21st-century American women